Tomoko (ともこ, トモコ) is a female Japanese given name. 
Like many Japanese names, Tomoko can be written using different kanji characters and can mean:
 友子 - "friendly child"
 知子 - "knowing child"
 智子 - "wise child"
 朋子 - "friendly child"
 皆子 - "beautiful girl"
 詩子 - "poetic child"

People with the name
 , Japanese politician
 , Japanese voice actress
 Tomoko Aran (荒野智子), born January 14, 1958, Japanese city pop artist
 , Japanese judoka
 , Japanese origami writer
 , Japanese swimmer
 , Japanese announcer
 , Japanese actress and essayist
 , Japanese motorcycle racer
 , Japanese actress
 , Japanese voice actress
 , Japanese politician
 , victim of Minamata disease and subject of the photo Tomoko and Mother in the Bath
 , Japanese singer
 , Japanese voice actress
 , Japanese artist
 , Japanese voice actress
 , Japanese singer
 , Japanese professional wrestler
 , Japanese singer, part of 1980s J-Pop duo BaBe
 , Japanese painter
 , Japanese voice actress
 Tomoko Masuzawa, American philosopher
 , Japanese women's footballer
 , Japanese film director and actress
 Tomoko Miho (1931 – 2012), American graphic designer
 , Japanese professional wrestler
 , Japanese photographer
 Tomoko Moriguchi-Matsuno (born 1945), American businesswoman
 , Japanese women's footballer
 , Japanese swimmer
 , Japanese voice actress
 , Japanese actress
 , Japanese businesswoman
 , Japanese actress
 , Japanese manga artist
 , Japanese rock climber
 , Japanese women's footballer
 , Japanese geneticist, pioneer of the nearly neutral theory of molecular evolution
 , Japanese fencer
 , Japanese volleyball player
 , Japanese swimmer
 , Japanese fencer
 , Japanese ice hockey player
 , Japanese lawyer, politician and writer
 , Japanese photographer
 Tomoko Sugawara, Japanese harpist
 , Japanese women's footballer
 , Japanese actress
 Tomoko Takahashi (born 1966), Japanese artist
 , Japanese politician
 Tomoko Tamura, Japanese table tennis player
 , Japanese ice dancer
 , Japanese singer, songwriter and arranger
 , Japanese manga artist
 , Japanese politician
 , Japanese actress and singer
 , Japanese tennis player
 , Japanese writer
 , Japanese volleyball player

Fictional characters
 Tomoko Anabuki a character from the Strike Witches light novel
 Tomoko Saeki, a character from the anime and manga series DNA²
 Tomoko Kuroki, the main character from the manga series WataMote
 Tomoko Nakaoka, the baby sister of Barefoot Gen.
, a character from the manga and anime series Great Teacher Onizuka
 Tomoko Nozama, a character from the tokusatsu show Kamen Rider Fourze
 In Liu Cixin's science fiction novel Death's End the ambassador of an alien civilisation is called 智子 and appears in the shape of a Japanese woman. This is a double entendre between sophon (a fictitious elementary particle) and the Japanese name.
 Tomoko Hayashi, a character from the tokusatsu show Himitsu Sentai Gorenger
 Tomoko Shiretoko, a character from the Boku no Hero Academia
 Tomoko Higashikata, a character from the anime and manga JoJo's Bizarre Adventure

References

See also 
"Tomoko",  a song by Icelandic singer Hafdís Huld
Tomoyo

Japanese feminine given names